In Austria, the "Federal Act Against Obscene Publications and for the Protection of Youth Morally Endangered" was passed in 1990 to regulate pornography in Austria. In 1994, a prohibition on child pornography was added to the law. Under these regulations, the minimum age for buying softcore pornography in Austria is 16, and the minimum age for buying hardcore pornography is 18. Publication of pornography or material depicting bestiality is illegal.

Child pornography is punishable by up to 10 years in prison.

In 2013, there have been an increasing number of reports of people accessing child pornography through the internet, according to Stopline—an internet authority set up by Internet Service Providers Austria (ISPA) to reduce illegal activity online.

According to the Austrian Press Agency, there were over 6,000 reports of illegal cases, more than double than that of 2012 report. At a press conference in Vienna, director Barbara Schlossbauer said that 98% of cases were related to child pornography, but only a third actually occurred in Austria. Within three days, 80% of the content was removed from the internet within three days by the Internet Service Providers Austria (ISPA).

See also

 Pornography laws by region
 Legality of child pornography

References

Austrian pornography